Yirrkala is a genus of eels in the snake eel family Ophichthidae. It is named after Yirrkala, an indigenous community in Arnhem Land, in the Northern Territory of Australia.

Species
There are currently 15 recognized species in this genus:

References

Ophichthidae